EGOT, also known as Eosinophil Granule Ontogeny (EGO)† Transcript (non-protein coding), is a human gene at 3p26.1 that produces a long noncoding RNA molecule. EGOT is nested within an intron of the inositol triphosphate receptor type 1 (ITPR1) gene. The EGOT transcript is expressed during eosinophil development and is possibly involved in regulating eosinophil granule protein expression. Comparison of EGO-B, the spliced isoform, suggests EGOT may be conserved across placental mammals.

†Originally published as EGO but renamed as EGOT because 'EGO' is a real word and is therefore problematic when searching the scientific literature.

References 

Genes on human chromosome 3
Non-coding RNA